Alert correlation is a type of long analysis. It focuses on the process of clustering alerts (events), generated by NIDS and HIDS computer systems, to form higher-level pieces of information.

Example of simple alert correlation is grouping invalid login attempts to report single incident like "10000 invalid login attempts on host X".

See also 

 ACARM
 ACARM-ng
 OSSIM
 Prelude Hybrid IDS
 Snort

Computer systems